Maggie Vision is the fifth studio album by Polish singer and songwriter Margaret. It was released on 12 February 2021 by her record label Gaja Hornby Records and Sony Music Entertainment Poland. Originally scheduled for 27 November 2020, its release was delayed due to the COVID-19 pandemic. The album's limited edition containing a bonus track was made available to pre-order on 23 October 2020.

Maggie Vision is a combination of hip hop and urban pop, and was executive produced by Piotr "Kacezet" Kozieradzki. The themes discussed on the album include women's empowerment, mental health, Poland's political situation, drug use, and the dark side of fame and show business. It contains collaborations with Young Igi, Kizo, Otsochodzi, Kukon, Kara, Natalia Szroeder, Stanislavv and Urboishawty.

The album debuted at number five in the Polish charts. It spawned nine singles, including "Reksiu" and "Roadster" which have been certified gold by the Polish Society of the Phonographic Industry (ZPAV). The album's accompanying Maggie Vision Tour took place in October 2021.

Promotion

Singles
The album was preceded by seven singles throughout 2020: "Nowe Plemię" on 19 March, "Przebiśniegi" on 17 April, "Reksiu" with Otsochodzi on 12 August, "Roadster" with Kizo on 11 September, "Fotel" and "Xanax" on 8 and 23 October, respectively, and "No Future" with Kukon on 10 November. On 29 January 2021, Margaret released the album's eighth single titled "Antipop" which features Kara. Its final single, "Sold Out", with Natalia Szroeder, was released on 12 February.

Maggie Vision Tour
The Maggie Vision Tour was Margaret's second headlining concert tour, which took place in five clubs in Poland between 8 and 23 October 2021.

Track listing

Charts

References

2021 albums
Margaret (singer) albums
Sony Music Poland albums